Tipu may refer to:

People 
 Tipu Aziz, British-Bangladeshi neurosurgeon
 Tipu Munshi, Bangladeshi politician
 Tipu Shah, leader of the Pagal Panthi movement against the East India Company
 Tipu Sharif, Pakistani actor and singer-songwriter 
 Tippu Tip or Tipu Tip, slave trader from Zanzibar and ruler of a state in Africa
 Adnan Shah Tipu or Tipu, Pakistani actor
 Golam Kibria Tipu, Bangladeshi politician
 Golam Sarwar Tipu, Bangladeshi footballer
 Ibrar Tipu, Bangladeshi composer and singer
 Mansoor Ali Tipu, Indian social worker
 Monirul Islam Tipu, Bangladeshi politician
 Ghulam Arieff Tipoo or Golam Arif Tipu, Bangladeshi jurist and language movement activist

Others 
 Tipu, Belize, a Mayan archaeological site near the Belize–Guatemala border
 1638 Tipu rebellion,  Mayan revolt against the Spanish
 Tipu, Estonia, a village in Kõpu Parish, Viljandi County, Estonia
 Tipu's Tiger, automaton of Tipu Sultan, the ruler of Mysore in India
 Tipuana tipu, a South American tree

See also
 Tipu Sultan (disambiguation)